Zu Xin, personal name Zi Dan, was a Shang dynasty King of China.

In the Records of the Grand Historian he was listed by Sima Qian as the fourteenth Shang king, succeeding his Father Zu Yi. He was enthroned in the year of Wuzi with Bi as his capital. He ruled for about 16 years (although the Bamboo Annals claim  14 years) before his death. He was given the posthumous name Zu Xin and was succeeded by his younger brother Wo Jia.

Oracle script inscriptions on bones unearthed at Yinxu alternatively record that he was the thirteenth Shang king.

References

Shang dynasty kings